The 2007 Sokoto State gubernatorial election occurred on April 14, 2007. PDP candidate Aliyu Magatakarda Wamakko won the election, defeating DPP Muhammed Dingyadi and 8 other candidates.

Results
Aliyu Magatakarda Wamakko from the PDP won the election. He defeated Muhammed Dingyadi of the DPP and 8 others.

The total number of registered voters in the state was 1,109,337.

Aliyu Magatakarda Wamakko, (PDP)- 392,258

Muhammed Dingyadi, DPP- 296,419

Abubakar Chika Sarkin Yaki, ANPP- 32,152

Umar Bello, AC- 9,706

Abdullahi Umar Farouk, APGA- 8,283

Aminu Salahtauma, CPP- 7,931

Abubakar Garba, ADC- 6,065

Bello Ibrahim Gusau, PPA- 5,931

Abdulwahab Yahaya Goronyo, UNDP- 3,572

Ahamed Bello Ahmed, AD- 3,365

References 

Sokoto State gubernatorial election
Sokoto State gubernatorial election
2007